Jethmal Parsram Gulrajani (1885 or 1886 – 6 July 1948) was a journalist, publisher, and writer from Sindh.  He launched a number of newspapers and literary magazines and authored 60 books.

Early life, education, and career 
Jethmal Parsram was born in Hyderabad, Sindh, British India (now Pakistan). His correct date of birth is unknown. According to G.M. Syed, he was born in 1885, however, according to Jotwani, his year of birth is 1886. He studied at the Nevalrai Hiranand Academy and passed matriculation examination from the Bambay University (now Mumbai University) in 1902. He was appointed as a teacher in his alma mater Nevalrai Hiranand Academy in 1902 and Sindh Madersatul Islam High School Karachi in 1910. Renowned writer Lalchand Amerdinomal was his colleague at the Sindh Madersatul Islam High School. He also served as a Headmaster at New High School Karachi but resigned in 1911. In 1916, he joined the Home Rule League of Annie Besant and took active part in this movement. From 1916 and onward no literary, social and political gathering in Hyderabad was complete, if Jethmal did not attend it. He was an aggressive public speaker too. He joined Sindh National College (now Government College University) Hyderabad in 1922 as a professor of Sindhi and served there till 1941.

Contributions as a journalist 
Jethmal Parsram was one of the most celebrated Sindhi literary journalists. He and his friend Lalchand Amardinomal founded the Sindhi Sahtya Society (Sindhi Literary Society) in 1914 under the auspices of which they launched the monthly Risalo (Literary magazine). After a year or so, the renowned writer Lalchand Amerdinomal became editor of this magazine. Jethmal launched daily Hindvasi in 1917. As a fearless journalist he wrote an editorial entitled Kalalki Hut, Kusan jo Kopu Vahay (Sindhi: ڪلالڪي ھٽ، ڪسڻ جو ڪوپ وھي) meaning people throne to the tavern to sever their heads in return for a draught. This title was a quotation from Shah Abdul Latif Bhitai's poetry. The editorial was written against the killing of innocent people who had peacefully protested against the Rowlatt Act (1919). The editorial also condemned the Jallianwala Bagh massacre by the British army. The then British Government of India treated this editorial as seditious. Consequently, Jethmal was arrested and sent to jail. During his imprisonment, he wrote his jail diary titled Turung-jo-Tirith (Pilgrimage of Prison). This was the first jail diary in Sindhi language which was published soon after his release from the jail. The daily Hindvasi was renamed as Bharatvasi during his imprisonment. He was released from jail in 1921 and continued as an editor and publisher of this newspaper. He also launched a monthly literary magazine Rooh Rihan in 1921.

About the same time, he started the "New Sindhi Library" and "Sasti Sahit" (Cheap Literature) series, a milestone in Sindhi publication under which he published more than a hundred books of standard merit, original and translated.

He launched weekly newspaper Sindh Herald in 1929. He also served as an editor of daily Parkash and honorary editor of weekly Sindhri.

Contributions as a writer 
Jethmal was not only a freedom fighter and journalist, he was also an illustrious scholar and writer of Sindhi language. He authored around 60 books. An incomplete alphabetical list of his books is presented below:

Books 

 Anand Darbar [Sindhi: آنند درٻار]
 Apanshud Gayan [Sindhi: اپنشد گيان]
 Atam Veechar [Sindhi: آتم ويچار], (Thoughts on Soul) 
 Bhagavad Gita [Sindhi: ڀڳوت گيتا]. (The translation of Annie Besant's book)
 Bal Hatia [Sindhi: ٻال ھتيا], (from  Leo Tolstoy's play  The Power of Darkness)
 Bhai Kalachand [Sindhi: ڀائي ڪرمچند]
 Budal Beri [Sindhi: ٻڏل ٻيڙي], (from Tagore's  The Wreck)
 Chamraposh-joon-Akhanyoon [Sindhi: چمڙاپوش جون آکاڻيون], (Stories of a Disguised Person) 
 Emerson [Sindhi: ايمرسن], (Translation of some famous vedantic essays)
 Faust [Sindhi: فائوسٽ], (Translation of Goethe's epic poem)
 Gal Blass [Sindhi: گال بلاس]
 Hamlet [Sindhi: ھيمليٽ], (Translation of Shakespeare's longest play)
 Hind aen Sindh ja Sant [Sindhi: ھند ۽ سنڌ جا سنت]
 Hisabi Hisab (from Shakespeare's  Measure for Measure)
 Jagat ja Netao [Sindhi: جڳت جو نيتائو]
 Margjoti aien Karan [Sindhi: مرگ جوتي ۽ ڪرم]
 Maut Hik Bahanu [Sindhi: موت ھڪ بھانو]
 Maut ta aahayee kona [Sindhi: موت تہ آھي ئي ڪو نہ]
 Miran Bai [Sindhi: ميران ٻائي]
 Monna Vanna [Sindhi: مونا وانا], (From  Maurice Maeterlinck's play of the same name)
 Nanik Yousuf [Sindhi: نانڪ يوسف]
 Om-ji-Akhani [Sindhi: اوم جي آکاڻي], (Story of Om) 
 Paighamber-e-Islam [Sindhi: پيغمبر اسلام]
 Parlok man Paigham [Sindhi: پرلوڪ مان پيغام]
 Philosophy chhaa Aahay [Sindhi: فلاسافي ڇا آھي؟]
 Poorab Joti [Sindhi: پورب جوتي], (adapted from Edwin Arnold's The Light of Asia)
 Raj Gayan [Sindhi: راج گيان]
 Richh [Sindhi: رڇ], (from Anton Chekkov's play "The Bear")
 Sachal Sarmast [Sindhi: سچل سرمست] 
 Sada Char [Sindhi: سدا چار], (with Lilaram Premchand)
 Sahati Rihan [ [Sindhi: ساھتي رھاڻ]]
 Samya Vad [Sindhi: ساميہ واد], (Socialism)
 Sanatan Dharam [Sindhi: سناتن ڌرم]
 Satgur jay charnan men [Sindhi: ستگروءَ جي چرنن ۾],
 Shabd Anahat [Sindhi: شبد اناھٽ], (The Voice of the Silence by Helena Petrovna Blavatsky)
 Shah Bhitaia Ji Hayati [Sindhi: شاھ ڀٽائيءَ جي حياتي], (Life of Shah Abdul Latif Bhitai) 
 Shah-joon-Akhanyoon [Sindhi: شاھ جون آکاڻيون], (Stories from Shah)
 Shah-je-Akhaniyun-jee-Samjhani [Sindhi: شاھ جي آکاڻين جي سمجھاڻي], (Interpretation of Shah's stories) 
 Shakespeare Through Indian Eye
 Sidhyoon ain Ghaker [Sindhi: سڌيون ۽ چڪر], (from Charles Leadbitter's famous book on Occultism).
 Sindh and its Sufis
 Sindhi Sahat Jo Khazano [Sindhi: سنڌي ساھت جو خزانو]
 Sindhi Soonhara [Sindhi: سڌي سونھارا]
 Sonu Gadahu [Sindhi: سونو گڏھ]
 Sufi Mat [Sindhi: صوفي مت]
 Sufi Sagora [Sindhi: صوفي سڳورا]
 Sukh Panth [Sindhi: سک پنٿ]
 Suraj Sagar [Sindhi: سورج ساگر]
 Toofan [Sindhi: طوفان] (from Shakespeare's  Measure for Measure)
 Turung-jo-Tirith  [Sindhi: ترنگ جو تيرٿ], (Pilgrimage of Prison)
 Upanishad Gyan [Sindhi: اپنشد گيان], (The Wisdom of the Upanishad  by Annie Besant) 
 Vidya Guru [Sindhi: وديا گرو]
 Yoga ji Samjhani [Sindhi: يوگا جي سمجھاڻي]

Death 
After creation of Pakistan in 1947, he reluctantly left his homeland Sindh and migrated to Bombay (now Mumbai) India, where he died on 6 July 1948.

Books on Jethmal Parsram 
Deepchandra Belani has written a monogram on life and writings of Jethmal Parsram.

References 

1948 deaths
Sindhi people
People from Hyderabad, Sindh
Sindhi-language writers
Year of birth uncertain